Agius is a surname of Maltese origin. People with this surname include:

 Adam Agius (born 1971), Australian member of the progressive metal band Alchemist
 Ambrose Agius (1856–1911), Maltese bishop
 Andrei Agius (born 1986), Maltese footballer
 Dionisius A. Agius (born 1945), Maltese professor of Arabic Studies and Islamic Material Culture
 Edmond Agius (born 1987), Maltese footballer
 Emmanuel Agius [born 1954], Maltese philosopher, theologian, priest
 Fred Agius (born 1984), Australian footballer
 Gilbert Agius (born 1974), Maltese footballer
 Giovanni Pietro Francesco Agius de Soldanis (1712–1770), Maltese linguist, historian and cleric
 Jamie Agius, Australian actor, in Short Changed (1986)
 Joe Agius (born 1992), Australian musician, singer and performer
 Joanna Agius (born 1958), Maltese archer
 Marcus Agius (born 1946), British financier and businessman
 Neil Agius (born 1986), Maltese swimmer
 Ross Agius, Australian rules footballer (1979–1984)
 Sébastien Agius (born 1983), French singer

Maltese-language surnames